Cássio Freitas (born 31 August 1965) is a Brazilian former cyclist. He competed in two events at the 1988 Summer Olympics.

References

External links
 

1965 births
Living people
Brazilian male cyclists
Brazilian road racing cyclists
Olympic cyclists of Brazil
Cyclists at the 1988 Summer Olympics
Sportspeople from Belo Horizonte
Volta a Portugal winners
20th-century Brazilian people
21st-century Brazilian people